Peter John Hennessy, Baron Hennessy of Nympsfield,  (born 28 March 1947) is an English historian and academic specialising in the history of government. Since 1992, he has been Attlee Professor of Contemporary British History at Queen Mary University of London.

Early life
Hennessy was born in Edmonton, north London, the youngest child of William G. Hennessy by his marriage to Edith (Wood-Johnson) Hennessy.  He comes from a large Catholic family of Irish provenance. He was brought up in large houses requisitioned by the local council, first in Allandale Avenue and then in Lyndhurst Gardens, Finchley, North London.

He attended the nearby Our Lady of Lourdes Primary School, and on Sundays he went to St Mary Magdalene Church, where he was an altar boy. (He was the subject of the first episode, first broadcast on 6 August 2007, of the BBC Radio 4 series The House I Grew Up In, in which he talked about his childhood.)

Hennessy was educated at St Benedict's School, a private school in Ealing, West London. After his father's job led the family to move to the Cotswolds, he attended Marling School, a grammar school in Stroud, Gloucestershire. He went on to study at St John's College, Cambridge, where he was awarded a BA in 1969 and a PhD in 1990. Hennessy was a Kennedy Memorial Scholar at Harvard University from 1971 to 1972.

Career

Journalism
Hennessy was a journalist for the Times Higher Education Supplement from 1972 to 1974. From 1974 to 1982, he wrote leaders for The Times, for which he was also the Whitehall correspondent. He was The Financial Times lobby correspondent at Westminster in 1976. In June 1977, Hennessy accused Donald Beves of being the "fourth man" in the Cambridge Spy Ring (then-known participants were Philby, Burgess, and Maclean), but Geoffrey Grigson and others quickly leapt to the defense of Beves, considering him uninterested in politics.

Hennessy wrote for The Economist in 1982. He was a regular presenter of Analysis on BBC Radio 4 from 1987 to 1992. On 17 November 2005, he made a trenchant appearance alongside Lord Wilson of Dinton before the House of Commons Public Administration Select Committee on the publication of political memoirs.

In July and August 2013 he was the interviewer for BBC Radio 4's Reflections, a series of four biographical interview programmes featuring Shirley Williams, Jack Straw, Norman Tebbit and Neil Kinnock. Hennessy continues to present the programme.

On 17 April 2022, he was interviewed by BBC Radio 4's Broadcasting House. On the subject of the Metropolitan Police fines issued to Boris Johnson for lockdown breaches during the Partygate scandal, he said "I think we're in the most severe constitutional crisis involving a prime minister that I can remember".

Academic career

Hennessy co-founded the Institute of Contemporary British History in 1986. From 1992 to 2000, he was professor of contemporary history at Queen Mary and Westfield College, University of London. From 1994 to 1997, he gave public lectures as Professor of Rhetoric at Gresham College, London. From 2001, he has been Attlee professor of contemporary British history at Queen Mary, University of London.

His analysis of post-war Britain, Never Again: Britain 1945–1951, won the Duff Cooper Prize in 1992 and the NCR Book Award in 1993.

His study of Britain in the 1950s and the rise of Harold Macmillan, Having It So Good: Britain in the 1950s, won the 2007 Orwell Prize for political writing.

Elevation to the peerage

On 5 October 2010 the House of Lords Appointments Commission said that Hennessy was to be a crossbench (non-political) peer. He was created a life peer on 8 November 2010, taking the title Baron Hennessy of Nympsfield, of Nympsfield in the County of Gloucestershire. He was introduced to the House of Lords on 25 November.

"I'm terribly pleased and honoured," Hennessy said at hearing the news. "I hope I can help the House of Lords a bit on constitutional matters. I'll certainly give it my best shot." In August 2014, Lord Hennessy was one of 200 public figures who were signatories to a letter to The Guardian opposing Scottish independence in the run-up to September's referendum.

Hennessy is married with two daughters.

Bibliography
 
Hennessy is the author of numerous articles and of the following books:
Cabinet (1986)  Blackwell
Whitehall (1989)  Pimlico
Revised and extended in 2001.
Never Again: Britain 1945–51 (1992)  Penguin
Revised and updated in 2006.
Pathways to the Pigeon Hole?: The Effectiveness of Official Inquiries (1993) University of Strathclyde
The Hidden Wiring: Unearthing the British Constitution (1995)  Gollancz
Ready, Steady, Go!: New Labour and Whitehall  (1997)  Fabian Society
The Blair Centre: A Question of Command and Control?  (1999) Public Management Foundation
The Prime Minister: The Office and Its Holders since 1945 (2001)  St. Martin's Press
The Secret State: Whitehall and the Cold War (2002)  Penguin
Republished and extended in 2010, see below.
Rulers and Servants of the State: The Blair Style of Government, 1997-2004 (2004)  Office for Public Management
Having It So Good: Britain in the Fifties (2006) 
Cabinets and the Bomb (2007)   Oxford University Press
The New Protective State: Government, Intelligence and Terrorism (2007)  Continuum
The Secret State: Preparing For The Worst 1945–2010 (2010)  Penguin
Distilling the Frenzy: Writing the History of One's Own Times (2012)  
Establishment and Meritocracy (2014)   Haus Publishing
Kingdom to Come: Thoughts on the Union Before and After the Scottish Referendum (2015)   Haus Publishing
Reflections: Conversations with Politicians (2016)   Haus Publishing
Expanded and reissued in 2020, see below.
The Silent Deep: The Royal Navy Submarine Service Since 1945 (2015) with James Jinks   Penguin
Winds of Change: Britain in the Sixties (2019)   Allen Lane
The Complete Reflections: Conversations with Politicians (2020)  Haus Publishing
A Duty of Care: Britain Before and After Corona (2022)  Penguin
The Bonfire of the Decencies: Repairing and Restoring the British Constitution (2022)  Haus Publishing

See also
 Gresham Professor of Rhetoric

References

Sources
'Corrected Oral Transcript of Oral Evidence presented to the House of Commons Public Administration Select Committee on the publication of political memoirs on 17 November 2005 by Lord Wilson of Dinton and Professor Peter Hennessy', 7 December 2005. Retrieved 31 December 2005

External links
  Staff of QMUL Department of History website
 Archives of Peter Hennessy held by Queen Mary, University of London Archives
 House of Lords official page
 The Guardian March 2004
 

1947 births
Living people
English male journalists
English historians
English people of Irish descent
English Roman Catholics
Fellows of the British Academy
Harvard University alumni
Kennedy Scholarships
People from Finchley
Academics of Queen Mary University of London
Alumni of St John's College, Cambridge
The Times people
People educated at St Benedict's School, Ealing
Crossbench life peers
Professors of Gresham College
People educated at Marling School
Historians of the United Kingdom
English constitutionalists
English male non-fiction writers
Honorary Fellows of the London School of Economics
People's peers
Life peers created by Elizabeth II